Open Up and Say... Ahh! is the second studio album by American glam metal band Poison, released in 1988 through Enigma Records. It proved to be the band's most successful release, and spawned four hit singles: "Nothin' But a Good Time", "Fallen Angel", "Your Mama Don't Dance" (a Loggins and Messina cover) and their only #1 single to date, "Every Rose Has Its Thorn". The album peaked at #2 on the US Billboard 200.

Open Up And Say Ahh was certified platinum in 1988 and 5× platinum in 1991 by the RIAA. It also has been certified 4× platinum in Canada and gold by the BPI.

Production and marketing
The album was recorded and mixed at Conway Recording Studios in Los Angeles. Paul Stanley from KISS (whose song "Rock and Roll All Nite" had been covered by Poison the year before) was originally selected to produce the record, but was unable to fulfill the role due to scheduling conflicts. Instead, the band worked with Tom Werman. Werman was an experienced rock producer, having worked with artists such as Ted Nugent, Cheap Trick, Twisted Sister and Mötley Crüe.
	
Following the album was the release of the band's first video compilation, titled Sight for Sore Ears, which featured all the music videos from Open Up and Say...Ahh! and Look What the Cat Dragged In.

Cover
The original front cover of the album, which featured model Bambi dressed as a luminous red demon with a protruding tongue, caused controversy among parental groups. The band changed the cover so that only the model's eyes were visible.

Track information
Vocalist Bret Michaels allegedly wrote the band's most successful single, "Every Rose Has Its Thorn", in response to a failed love affair with a Los Angeles stripper. Poison had been playing at a cowboy bar called The Ritz in Dallas, Texas. After the show, Michaels called the woman at her apartment and heard a man's voice in the background. Heartbroken, he wrote the song with an acoustic guitar in a laundromat.

The first single "Nothin' But a Good Time" was born from the merger of a guitar riff by C. C. DeVille and a chorus by Michaels. Michaels later explained that he was in search of a "kick ass big arena rock song" which would make him feel good about his life. The song was about "not wanting to be held back by working a job and being depressed", as portrayed in its music video.

The music video for the second single, "Fallen Angel", features model and then aspiring singer/actress Susie Hatton (Bret's then-girlfriend, who released one solo album, Body and Soul; in 1991).

The fourth single, "Your Mama Don't Dance", was a cover version of the 1972 song written by Loggins and Messina from their 1972 self-titled album, which was recently covered by hard rock band Y&T on their album Down for the Count.

Two additional songs written for the record, "Livin' for the Minute" and "Face the Hangman", were later released as B-sides. "Face the Hangman" was later included on Crack a Smile... and More!.

Track listing

Personnel
Bret Michaels – lead vocals, rhythm guitar, acoustic guitar (track 8), harmonica (track 4)
C.C. DeVille – lead guitar, background vocals, keyboards (track 8)
Bobby Dall – bass, background vocals
Rikki Rockett – drums, background vocals

Additional credits:
John Purdell – keyboard, horn

Charts

Weekly charts

Year-end charts

Certifications

References

External links
 theGAZZ.com, Interview with Bret Michaels. Retrieved October 13, 2006.
 Classic Rock Revisited, Classic Trax, Interview with Bret Michaels. Retrieved January 6, 2005.

Poison (American band) albums
1988 albums
Albums produced by Tom Werman
Enigma Records albums
Obscenity controversies in music